Durand de Bredons (died 1071) was a French Benedictine and bishop of Toulouse from about 1058. He was from Bredons in the Auvergne.

He was from about 1048 Abbot of Moissac, a Cluniac reformer there.

Notes

External links
 

1071 deaths
French Benedictines
Bishops of Toulouse
Cluniacs
11th-century French people
Year of birth unknown